Group L of the 2019 FIBA Basketball World Cup was the second stage of the 2019 FIBA Basketball World Cup for four teams, top two teams from Group G and two from Group H. The results of round one were carried over. The teams played against the teams from the group they have not faced before, for a total of two games per team, with all games played at Nanjing Youth Olympic Sports Park Gymnasium, Nanjing. After all of the games were played, the top two teams advanced to Quarter-finals, the third placed team was classified 9 to 12 and the fourth placed team 13 to 16.

Qualified teams

Standings

All times are local UTC+8.

Games

Australia vs. Dominican Republic

France vs. Lithuania

Dominican Republic vs. Lithuania

France vs. Australia

References

External links

2019 FIBA Basketball World Cup